Rahmatabad-e Mian Deran (also Romanized as Raḩmatābād-e Mīān Derān; also known as Raḩmatābād) is a village in Jazmurian Rural District, Jazmurian District, Rudbar-e Jonubi County, Kerman Province, Iran. At the 2006 census, its population was 1,013, in 209 families.

References 

Populated places in Rudbar-e Jonubi County